A diocese is the basic regional unit of many churches. The Diocese of New York (each headed by a Bishop of New York) may refer to:
Episcopal Diocese of New York
Orthodox Church in America Diocese of New York and New Jersey
Roman Catholic Archdiocese of New York